Michael Rosenbaum (born July 11, 1972) is an American actor and podcaster. He is known for portraying Lex Luthor on the Superman television series Smallville, a role that TV Guide included in their 2013 list of "The 60 Nastiest Villains of All Time".

Rosenbaum is also known for portraying Martinex in Guardians of the Galaxy Vol. 2, Parker in Urban Legend, Adam/Adina in Sorority Boys and  Dutch Nilbog on Fox's Breaking In. He also has an extensive voiceover career in animation, such as his role of Wally West / The Flash in the DC Animated Universe series Justice League (2001–04) and its sequel Justice League Unlimited (2004–06). Between 2015 and 2016, he played the lead role in the TV Land comedy series Impastor.

He is also the lead singer of the band Sun Spin with his friend Rob Danson. The band's first album, Best Days was released on February 9, 2021.

Early life
Rosenbaum was born in Oceanside, New York and raised in Newburgh, Indiana. His mother, Julie (née Eckstein), is a writer and his father, Mark Rosenbaum, worked in pharmaceuticals. He is one of six children with two brothers, and a sister. After his parents' divorce, his mother remarried sports reporter Gordon Engelhardt, and his father remarried Alexis Pelegrino, with whom he had two daughters, Rosenbaum's half-sisters. His uncle is pet behaviorist Warren Eckstein. Rosenbaum is Jewish, and says he was "closer to religion" in New York than in Indiana.

Rosenbaum graduated from Castle High School in Newburgh, Indiana and from Western Kentucky University in Bowling Green, Kentucky with a degree in theatre arts. Immediately after, he moved to New York City to pursue an acting career.

Career
In 2001, Rosenbaum received a Saturn Award for his portrayal of Lex Luthor on Smallville. Continuing in the superhero genre, he played Wally West (a.k.a. the Flash) in the DC Comics animated series Justice League, Static Shock, and Justice League Unlimited as well as portraying a younger version of Wally West as Kid Flash in Teen Titans. In the third season Justice League Unlimited episode "Great Brain Robbery", Rosenbaum reprised his role as Lex Luthor when his character was trapped in Clancy Brown's Lex Luthor's body. In February 2008, Rosenbaum confirmed that he would be leaving Smallville after the seventh season of the show. After many months of speculation and him first turning down the contract to return, it was announced on February 11, 2011 that Rosenbaum would return to Smallville for the two-hour series finale, which aired on May 13, 2011, with Rosenbaum reprising his role as Lex Luthor.

In 2012, Rosenbaum appeared in Hit and Run, a movie that he made with his friends Dax Shepard and Kristen Bell. Michael portrayed the character Gil, a jealous ex-boyfriend from Annie's (Bell's character) past.

Rosenbaum does impressions including Christopher Walken, Keanu Reeves, Rodney Dangerfield, Dudley Moore, John Malkovich, Harry Carey,  and Kevin Spacey. The makers of the DCAU have had Rosenbaum do his Walken voice for Ghoul in Batman Beyond: Return of the Joker and his Spacey voice for Deadshot; Spacey coincidentally portrayed Lex Luthor in the film Superman Returns, and Walken played Max Shreck in Batman Returns. Rosenbaum filmed the original SyFy comedy series Saved By Zeroes; yet was never picked up. He recurred in Fox's original sitcom Breaking In; the show was cancelled initially after the first season but got a second chance, and Rosenbaum was promoted to series regular. The series was cancelled again after a few episodes of the second season.

In 2014, Rosenbaum made his feature-film directorial and writing debut with the comedy Back in the Day, where he stars as an actor who returns to his hometown in Indiana for a class reunion. The movie was filmed in Newburgh and Evansville, Indiana. Prior to the production of Back in the Day, Rosenbaum planned to direct another comedy film, titled Sorry is For Sissies. The film had a cast including Jon Heder, Colin Hanks and Jennifer Love Hewitt; however, at least half of the film's budget was lost, and the film was scrapped.

On June 17, 2014, Rosenbaum was cast as the lead in the TV Land original sitcom Impastor. The plot has been summarised as a "low-life who hides out in a small town by conning the residents into thinking he is their newly hired gay pastor".

In 2017, Rosenbaum served as narrator for the reality television show Hunted which pitted investigators against teams of ordinary citizens trying to evade capture as fugitives. Rosenbaum also starred in the Indie thriller "The Neighbor" opposite William Fichtner.

In 2018, Rosenbaum debuted his casual celebrity interview-based podcast called Inside of You. His first guest was his Smallville co-star Tom Welling. The two have launched a podcast Talkville, where they re-watch every episode of Smallville in July 2022.

On August 5, 2022, Rosenbaum confirmed that he will reprise the role of Martinex in Guardians of the Galaxy Vol. 3 in May 2023.

On January 6th, 2023 Rosenbaum's band SUN SPIN released their second album, "Never is what it is".

Filmography

Film

Television

Video games

References

External links

1972 births
20th-century American male actors
21st-century American male actors
21st-century American Jews
Living people
Male actors from Indiana
American male film actors
American male television actors
American male video game actors
American male voice actors
Jewish American male actors
People from Newburgh, Indiana
Actors from Evansville, Indiana
Writers from Evansville, Indiana
Western Kentucky University alumni